is a Japanese footballer currently studying at the Niigata University of Health and Welfare.

Career statistics

Club
.

Notes

References

External links

2001 births
Living people
Japanese footballers
Niigata University of Health and Welfare alumni
Association football defenders
J3 League players
FC Tokyo U-23 players
FC Tokyo players